St Mungo's High School is a mixed, Roman Catholic, secondary school in Falkirk, Scotland.

As the only Catholic secondary school in Falkirk, St Mungo's attracts students from the entire council area and its six Catholic primary schools. The new St Mungo's High School building was built on the former school's sports pitches, and opened in 2009.

History 
The school was named after St Mungo, founder and patron saint of the city of Glasgow.

In 1953 the school was formally opened. 

In 2009, the new school building opened on the former school's sport pitches after Ogilvie construction rebuilt three local schools including St Mungo's High School under Falkirk Council's second Public Private Partnership scheme costing £25.4m for the rebuild. The new school houses modern sporting and educational facilities whilst also being sustainable.

Digital Accreditations 
In 2016 the school became the first in Scotland to completely switch and integrate Office 365 into every school department which in turn gained the school their first Microsoft Showcase Award.

In 2019 St Mungo's gained a further Microsoft Showcase Award.

In 2019 nine local schools including St Mungo's High school were awarded a Digital Schools Award by Education Scotland. The award ceremony was held within St Mungo's in September 2019 where all the schools were officially presented the award.

Feeder primaries
The school is secondary to 7 primary schools: St Francis Xaviers, St Joseph’s, St Bernadette's, Sacred Heart, St Andrew's, St Patrick's and St Mary's.

Football teams
In 2012 the boys' and girls' football teams won their respective Lloyds TSB Scottish Schools' Shields.

Incidents
In 2013 Andrew Ferguson (17) posted violent and threatening messages about the school and its staff on Twitter. He was ordered to do community service.

In February 2022, an examination of facts hearing at Dunfermline Sheriff Court found that Thomas Black, 73, had sexually assaulted four male pupils at the school while he was Head of Biology there between 1978 and 1995. Black was unable to  undergo a criminal trial because of health issues, but was placed on the Sex Offenders' Register for five years.

Notable former pupils
Craig Eddie, winner of the tenth series of The Voice UK.

References

External links 
 
 Twitter Page

Buildings and structures in Falkirk
Secondary schools in Falkirk (council area)